The White River springfish (Crenichthys baileyi) is a species of fish in the family Goodeidae, the splitfins. It is a rare species of the Great Basin of western United States, where it is endemic to isolated warm springs in the White River drainage of eastern Nevada.

Each side has two rows of dark blotches. The pelvic fins are entirely absent, while the anal fin is large, with 14 rays. The dorsal fin is set far back on the body, just above the anal fin, and is somewhat smaller than the anal fin, with 11 rays.

Subspecies
FishBase records five subspecies:
 Crenichthys baileyi albivallis J. E. Williams & Wilde, 1981 – Preston White River springfish
 Crenichthys baileyi baileyi (C. H. Gilbert, 1893) – White River springfish
 Crenichthys baileyi grandis J. E. Williams & Wilde, 1981 – Hiko White River springfish
 Crenichthys baileyi moapae J. E. Williams & Wilde, 1981 – Moapa White River springfish
 Crenichthys baileyi thermophilus J. E. Williams & Wilde, 1981 – Mormon White River springfish

Etymology
The genus name is a compound of creno meaning "spring", a reference to the desert springs this species occurs in, and ichthys which is Greek for "fish". The specific name honours the American ethnologist and naturalist Vernon Orlando Bailey (1864-1942), who co-collected the type along with C. Hart Merriam.

Notes

References
 Sigler, W. F. and J. W. Sigler. Fishes of the Great Basin (Reno: University of Nevada Press, 1987), pp. 260–262
 La Rivers, I. Fishes and Fisheries of Nevada (Nevada State Fish and Game Commission, 1962) pp. 512–516
 Williams, J. E. and G. R. Wilde. (1981). Taxonomic status and morphology of isolated populations of the white river springfish, Crenichthys baileyi (Cyprinodontidae).  Southwest. Nat. 485–503.

External links
White River springfish (Crenichthys baileyi baileyi). Nevada Fish and Wildlife Office, United States Fish and Wildlife Service.
Hiko White River springfish (Crenichthys baileyi grandis). Nevada Fish and Wildlife Office, United States Fish and Wildlife Service.

White River springfish
Fish of the Western United States
Fauna of the Great Basin
Endemic fauna of Nevada
Fish described in 1893